Viršuliškės is an eldership in the Vilnius city municipality, Lithuania. It occupies 2,6 km². According to the 2011 census, it has a population of 14,733.

History
Before the neighborhood was incorporated into Vilnius city municipality in 1969, it was a small settlement. After the incorporation, in 1977, new residents started to move here to the newly built multistorey Soviet apartment blocks.

There is a Tarptautinė teisės ir verslo aukštoji mokykla (TTVAM).

References

Neighbourhoods of Vilnius